Kurdish Hezbollah of Iran is an Islamist political party created in Iran in 1983 under the leadership of Sheikh Mohammed Khalid Barzani. Kurdish Hezbollah of Iran is very close to the Islamic Republic of Iran, and isn't separatist like most other Kurdish parties. Qadir Osman, the leader of this party, said "our friendship with Iran is very good and there are visits among us".

In 1988, Adham Barzani, within this group and under his control, established Kurdish Revolutionary Hezbollah, an offshoot of the Kurdish Hezbollah of Iran.

See also
Kurdish Hezbollah
Kurdish Revolutionary Hezbollah

References

Kurdish Islamic organisations
Kurdish Islamism
Kurdish political parties in Iran